Vladislav Misyak (born 15 July 1995) is a Bulgarian footballer currently playing as a winger for Boruna Tsareva Livada.

Career

Levski Sofia
Born in Kyustendil, Misyak began playing football at the local club FC Buzludzha, before joining Levski Sofia at the age of 13.

He made his first team debut in a 2–0 league win over Botev Plovdiv on 22 March 2014.

Neftochimic Burgas
On 11 January 2016 he signed for B Group team Neftochimic Burgas.

Arda Kardzhali
On 21 June 2017, after a season in Lokomotiv Sofia, he joined Third League club Arda Kardzhali.

Yantra Gabrovo
In January 2020, Misyak moved to Yantra Gabrovo 2019.

Statistics
As of 20 December 2015

References

External links
 
 Profile at LevskiSofia.info

1995 births
Living people
Bulgarian footballers
Bulgaria youth international footballers
Association football wingers
First Professional Football League (Bulgaria) players
PFC Levski Sofia players
Neftochimic Burgas players
FC Arda Kardzhali players
FC Montana players
FC Yantra Gabrovo players
People from Kyustendil
Sportspeople from Kyustendil Province